This list of John Madin buildings categorizes the work of the architect. His buildings including private residences, commercial office blocks and wider civic schemes.

References

External links
Official John Madin website

Madin, John
John Madin